The Turkmenistan national under-17 football team is the under-17 football (soccer) team of Turkmenistan and is controlled by the Football Federation of Turkmenistan.

Competitive record

FIFA U-17 World Cup record

For 1985 to 1991 see Soviet Union national under-16 football team.

*Denotes draws including knockout matches decided on penalty kicks.

AFC U-16 Championship record 

U17
Turkemnistan